FC Samtredia, commonly known simply as Samtredia, is a Georgian association football club based in the city of Samtredia.

The club gained promotion to Erovnuli Liga, the first tier of Georgian football system, after the 2022 season. Their home ground is Erosi Manjgaladze Stadium.

In 2016, Samtredia won the champion's title and the Super Cup.

History

In the Soviet leagues
Established in 1936, Samtredia spent years in the Georgian championship before the club obtained the right to participate in the Soviet Second League, the third tier of the Soviet football system. Several times Lokomotivi Samtredia finished their season as runners-up, twice won the league, although eventually failed to win the knock-out stages of the competition against winners of other two zones. 

Below are all-time results during these 17 consecutive seasons in the Second league.

  
Following the 1989 season the Samtredian team as well as all other Georgian clubs withdrew from their relevant Soviet leagues after Georgian Football Federation broke ties with the Soviet Football Federation and formed an independent championship.

After Independence
Sanavardo Samtredia became member of a new national Umaglesi liga.     
While twice, in 1993/94 and 1995/96, they finished in the 4th place, in 1994/1995 the club ended the season with the silver, which implied qualification for the preliminary round of UEFA Cup. But the debut in European football competitions turned out unsuccessful. Soon they fell from the top flight followed by relegation from Pirveli Liga as well.

In 2014/15 Samtredia reached the final of David Kipiani Cup. In previous rounds they had knocked out four opponents, including contenders for the title Dinamo Batumi, Torpedo Kutaisi and Chikhura, but resistance offered to Dinamo Tbilisi proved insufficient.

The most fruitful period for Samtredia was in mid-2010s, when they finished among top three teams of Umaglesi liga for three seasons in a row. Moreover, in 2016, under head coach Giorgi Tsetsadze they became champions for the first time in their history after victory over Chikhura Sachkhere in the championship playoffs.
Samtredia completed the season with the double after they beat Georgian Cup holders Torpedo Kutaisi in the Super Cup game.

In 2019, the club took part in Liga 2, although returned to the top division after one season. Manager Kakhaber Kacharava, who guided Samtredia back to the top flight, had to quit the club in September 2020 after just one point earned in last five league games and a shock Cup defeat from Liga 3 minnows Tbilisi City.

New head coach Giorgi Mikadze steered Samtredia away from the relegation zone, but in February 2021 he was replaced by Giorgi Tsetsadze, who had once brought the club to their only champion's title. His second tenure lasted eight months, though. The team lost a survival struggle and finished at the bottom of the table. 

As in the previous case three years earlier, it took Samtredia a year to move back to the top flight. Under Giorgi Shashiashvili the team beat their rivals for a playoff spot and qualified for decisive matches for the third time in the last five years. Another victory over Sioni completed their successful league campaign in 2022.

Seasons

Domestic leagues

European record

Current squad 
As of 28 February 2023

 (On loan from Dinamo Tbilisi)

 (On loan from Sabah)

 (C)

Managers

 Levan Anjaparidze (Jan - Jul 2011)
 Koba Mikadze (Aug - Oct 2011)
 Gia Bendeliani (Oct 2011 - Sep 2012)
 Leri Megeneishvili (Sep - Dec 2012)
 Dato Chelidze (Jan - Jun 2013)
 Ucha Sosiashvili (Jul - Dec 2013)
 Gela Sanaia (Jan - Oct 2014)
 Giorgi Tsetsadze (Oct 2014 - Sep 2018)
 Giorgi Daraselia (Sep - Dec 2018)
 Kakhaber Kacharava (Jan 2019 - Aug 2020)
 Giorgi Mikadze (Aug 2020 - Jan 2021)
 Giorgi Tsetsadze (Feb - Oct 2021)
 Leri Megeneishvili (Oct 2021 - Jan 2022)
 Giorgi Shashiashvili (Since Feb 2022)

Notable players
Born in Samtredia, Kаkha Kaladze began his football career at the age of 11 in FC Samtredia's junior team as a striker.

Honours

Umaglesi Liga/Erovnuli Liga
Winners: 2016

Runners-up: 1994-95, 2015-16

Bronze medals: 2017

Pirveli Liga/Erovnuli Liga 2
 
Winners: 2008-09, 2013-14

Runners-up: 1997-98, 2019

Third place: 2011-12 (A Group), 2022 

Georgian Cup

Runners-up: 2014-2015

Georgian Super Cup
Winners: 2017

Sponsors
Since 2019 Archi development company has been a general sponsor of FC Samtredia.

Name
Throughout their history Samtredia have also been named Lokomotivi, Sanavardo, Juba and Iberia with the current name regained in 2006.

Samtredia literally means a place where pigeons reside and comes from Georgian word mtredi - pigeon.

References

External links
 Official Website
 Soccerway

 
Samtredia
1936 establishments in Georgia (country)
Association football clubs established in 1936
Samtredia